Heraeus is a German technology group with a focus on precious and special metals, medical technology, quartz glass, sensors and specialty light sources. Founded in Hanau in 1851, the company is one of the largest family-owned companies in Germany in terms of revenue. Heraeus employs approximately 16,200 people in 40 countries worldwide and generated a total revenue of 29.5 billion euro in 2021.

History

1851 – 1895 

In 1851, at the age of 24, the pharmacist and chemist Wilhelm Carl Heraeus took over his father's "Einhorn Apothecary" in Hanau. The business had been in the ownership of the Heraeus family since 1660, acting as an official court apothecary to local counts. Wilhelm Carl Heraeus began laying the foundations for a global family business, which has now been headquartered in Hanau, east of Frankfurt, for more than 150 years. At the time, Hanau was a town of goldsmiths. Since the end of the 18th century, platinum had been processed in the town for the production of jewellery. Goldsmiths had extreme difficulty processing platinum due to its toughness and high melting point of 1770 degrees Celsius. Until a melting process was discovered, platinum could only be processed by using complex forging processes using the white-hot metal. Having studied chemistry and pharmacy, Wilhelm Carl Heraeus understood the problems faced by goldsmiths. After a series of experiments, he first succeeded in melting platinum in large volumes and producing pure metal in 1856, using his own specially developed oxyhydrogen blowpipe. It was already known at the time that platinum could be melted using oxyhydrogen, a mixture of hydrogen and oxygen gas – but until then, only small quantities had been melted in a laboratory. With his gas blowpipe, Heraeus could produce enough oxyhydrogen and a large enough flame front to melt several kilograms of platinum-containing materials. This pioneering achievement enabled Heraeus to found the "W.C. Heraeus First German Platinum Smelters", supplying a variety of customers such as goldsmith workshops and jewellery factories throughout the world, as well as dental manufacturers, chemistry laboratories and other branches of industry. In 1857, W.C. Heraeus succeeded in producing around 30 kilograms of pure platinum. By 1896, he was melting and processing more than 1000 kilograms of pure platinum.

1896 – 1927 

Further experimentation in the platinum smelters’ laboratories resulted in a variety of inventions and revolutionary new production processes. These included the production of pharmaceutical iron compounds, chemically pure hydrofluoric acid, rubidium and caesium. Most production at this time still involved platinum, which was used in more and more applications due to its chemical and physical properties. As it is also highly resistant to acids and heat, platinum was also used to make instruments such as scientific tools, crucibles and vessels used in chemistry and physics. As early as the 19th century, platinum had already been used in locking pins to hold false teeth in place. Platinum was also used to make filaments in light bulbs and non-corrosive electrical contacts in telephones. As the company continued to expand, it needed new premises – so in 1896, the W.C. Heraeus Platinum Smelting Factory was established just outside Hanau, employing 40 people. Two years later, Wilhelm and Heinrich Heraeus, the two sons of the company founder, took over as managers. They were responsible for pushing ahead with research and development, and bringing on board a former school friend, the physicist and chemist Richard Küch. Küch, who became a director in 1909, had many contacts in the world of science and continued to carry out fundamental research, resulting in further growth in the company. Among his achievements were the development of a process to melt rock crystal at around 2000 °C to produce quartz glass. The quartz glass produced by the company was almost entirely free of defects and was of outstanding purity. It is still used in medicine today and is a highly sought-after material in manufacturing on account of its translucence and resistance to heat and acids. With the advent of ceramic colours, more and more platinum was needed for production processes and Heraeus started supplying products to the electrochemical and plastics industries. By the beginning of the 20th century, a major platinum processing boom was underway, caused by demand in the chemicals industry for large volumes of platinum thermocouples and platinum-rhodium catalysts needed to produce nitric acid.

One of the most significant technical innovations in metal processing is credited to Heraeus: the melting of metals under vacuum. Heraeus Vacuumschmelze and Doctor Wilhelm Rohn applied for a patent on this process on 12 January 1918 and were granted a German patent DE 345161. Heraeus was subsequently granted British patent GB 138648, Swiss patent CH 89145, and several French patents on the process. For a short time, Heraeus set up an independent division dedicated to this technology, ‘Heraeus Vacuum Smelting’, which registered 84 German patents in 10 years.

1927 – 1945 
The third generation of the family took over the business in 1927, under Wilhelm Heinrich Heraeus and his cousin Reinhard Heraeus, who remained at the helm of the business for nearly 40 years. During this time, Heraeus tapped into a variety of new material discoveries. For example, they started producing the first dental alloys. This approach took the company from strength to strength and broadened its product portfolio. The company also suffered setbacks during this time. The First World War and hyperinflation in the Weimar Republic resulted in the collapse of the precious metal market in Russia and massive swings in the price of platinum. As a result, Heraeus began focussing its research activities on recycling techniques and started to look for suitable ersatz materials and substances to replace precious metals. Despite the turbulent times in Germany, the business continued to grow. With the outbreak of the Second World War, many workers were drafted into military service. The company shifted its production to electrical contacts with low densities of precious metals, catalysts, and rhodium reflectors for anti-aircraft searchlights. Allied bombing raids in 1944 and 1945 resulted in the near-total destruction of the town of Hanau as well as Heraeus production facilities.

1945 – 1983 

During German reconstruction, the company turned its attention back to its established products and expanding new production facilities. The first steps towards expanding internationally and entering foreign markets had already been laid at the beginning of the 20th century by the company's founder. The company re-established its network of contacts after the Second World War, allowing it to gain new customers in the American market for quartz glass for optical applications. Beginning in 1958, the company founded its first sales subsidiaries in France and Italy, followed by full subsidiaries and international holdings as of 1972. The company subsequently set up new quartz glass factories in Japan and the United States, followed by manufacturing facilities in South Korea and the Philippines to produce contact wires (wire bonding) made of pure gold for use in semiconductor components. In 1970, Helmut Gruber, a respected physicist in the field of metallurgy, took over as head director, with company-wide responsibility for the technical department. Gruber pushed ahead with operations in the fields of quartz glass, precious metal chemistry and special metals. He also set up even more subsidiaries outside Germany. Sales outside Germany first outstripped domestics sales in 1979.

Since 1983 

From 1983 until 2000, the company – by now in its fourth generation – was headed up by Jürgen Heraeus, the son of Reinhard Heraeus and a company director since 1970. Under his management, the business grew into a global group of companies. To pave the way for this expansion, the company was fundamentally reorganised and modern management structures introduced. Following the founding of Heraeus Holding GmbH in 1985, the company underwent an intense period of decentralisation in 1990. Under the umbrella of the management holding, the group's core activities of precious metals, dental materials, quartz glass, sensors and medical technology were reorganised into five decentralised, independent management divisions. Simultaneously, the company expanded in Asia. Heraeus also entered strategically important markets, such as through the acquisition of Electro-Nite. As the company grew, sales and operating profits reflected its standing as an international group. By 2001, sales outside Germany first broke the 74% mark. To exploit synergies throughout the group, Heraeus refocused its activities on core business, resulting in the setting up of Heraeus Noblelight as an independent business in 2001. The Heraeus Med part of the company was sold in 2002, as were the group's shares in Kendro Laboratory Products. At the same time, W. C. Heraeus intensified its involvement in industrial precious metals by expanding its activities in the field of thin film materials. The company's wire bonding operations in China were also expanded, and the company entered into a joint venture in South Africa which soon evolved into a fully-fledged subsidiary. Heraeus also expanded its activities in medical technology with the acquisition of the Swiss company Metalor Medical Division.

Since 2001 – More than 160 years of Heraeus 
After Heraeus Dental was sold to the Mitsui Group, a Japanese company, in 2013, Heraeus Holding comprised six business groups. Under a restructuring of the organization, the business groups Heraeus Precious Metals and Heraeus Materials Technology were converted to seven new Global Business Units (GBUs). The four remaining business groups were retained and are now likewise managed as GBUs. As of January 2015, the Heraeus Group is organized under the umbrella of Heraeus Holding with eleven GBUs.

In October 2018, Heraeus extended its sales channels in Germany by opening the online platform Heraeus-Gold.de in co-operation with the precious metals trader Ophirum GmbH. The platform allows retail customers to buy Heraeus precious metal bars and a variety of popular coins.

Corporate structure

Heraeus Metal Management 
This GBU includes products of the precious metals cycle, including precious metal trading, precious metal recycling, and the melting and pre-production of precious metals. These functions, which were formerly located in Heraeus Precious Metals and Heraeus Materials Technology, were combined to form the current Heraeus Metal Management.

Heraeus Chemicals 
This GBU specializes in the development of products and solutions for the chemical industry and pharmaceutical industry. In addition to catalysts, it also sells pharmaceutical ingredients.

Heraeus Electronics 
This GBU manufactures products for the electronics, consumer goods and automotive industries. These include bonding wires and assembly materials for integrated circuit and mounting technologies, as well as miniaturized electronics components such as thick film pastes, powders and conductive polymers.

Heraeus Photovoltaics 
This GBU is a manufacturer in the field of thick film technology for the photovoltaic industry.

Heraeus Medevio 
This GBU develops and produces components and solutions for the medical technology industry. These include microparts such as pacemaker components and components for the treatment of vascular diseases.

Heraeus Performance Products 
Products manufactured by Heraeus Performance Products can be found in the hard drive industry, the watchmaking and automotive industries, and in the areas of lab equipment and decorative coloring.

Heraeus Medical 
Heraeus Medical manufactures bone cement and develops coatings for medical implants. Its products are used in orthopedic surgery as well as traumatology and biosurgery.

Heraeus Electro-Nite 
Heraeus Electro-Nite provides measurement and sampling technology for metal smelting. Its portfolio includes sensors, sampling devices tailored for specific applications, and hardware and software for systems technology.

Heraeus Quarzglas 
Heraeus Quarzglas specializes in the manufacture and processing of high-purity quartz glass. This GBUt manufactures quartz glass for the semiconductor industry and telecommunication industry as well as for applications in the optical industry, chemical industry and lamp industries.

Heraeus Noblelight 
Specialty light sources from Heraeus Noblelight are used in the industrial, scientific and medical fields, with wavelengths ranging from ultraviolet to infrared.

Heraeus Emerging Businesses 
This GBU includes the two business lines Sensors and Display & Semiconductors.

Incubator New Businesses 
The Incubator New Businesses is a platform for new, high growth businesses. These activities are independently managed and include among others:
 Heraeus Fuel Cells GmbH, producer of AnkaloN(R) Catalyst Coated Membranes (CCMs) for PEM fuel cells in automobiles, transport and commercial vehicles, as well as stationary applications.
 Heraeus Additive Manufacturing GmbH (H3D), solution provider for Additive Manufacturing. H3D develops powders and manufacturing processes for advanced materials such as metallic glasses, refractory metals, titanium aluminides and precious metals.

Sold, restructured and disinvested businesses 

As part of the reorganization in 2015, Heraeus Precious Metals and Materials Technology were converted to seven Global Business Units.

W.C. Heraeus 
The precious metals division of the company always generated the most sales for Heraeus. When the price of gold, silver and platinum rose sharply in the 1930s, Heraeus also turned to platinum group metals such as palladium, rhodium and ruthenium. The development of the precious metal strowger switch and high-speed contact opened the market to Heraeus in 1950 to sell large volumes of contact rivets and springs. This laid the foundations for the company to enter markets such as telecommunications, microelectronics and computing.
W. C. Heraeus was split up in 2010 to form Heraeus Precious Metals and Heraeus Materials Technology.

Heraeus Kulzer  
The particularly hard nature of the dental material Alba (an alloy of gold, silver and palladium) allowed Heraeus to supply dental technology as early as the 1930s. In the years that followed, Heraeus developed a variety of gold and ceramic bonding alloys. Heraeus Kulzer was split up in 2009 to form Heraeus Dental and Heraeus Medical.

Heraeus Vacuum Smelting 
The process of smelting metals in a vacuum is based on early development work carried out by Heraeus. The first vacuum furnaces came into use before the First World War. They were used to make alloys in the total absence of air. The first vacuum induction furnace was developed in 1917. Heraeus Vacuum Smelting started operations as an independent company in 1923, producing a variety of base metal alloys for use in electrics. The company owned 84 German patents between 1923 and 1933, resulting in 101 foreign registrations. Due to the increasingly high cost of investment and the different nature of this area of the business compared to the rest of the company, Heraeus sold its Vacuum Smelting business to Siemens (now SMS-MEVAC) in 1933. The Ruhrstahl-Heraeus process for vacuum degassing of steel was also a Heraeus innovation.

Heraeus Analytical Technology  
In the beginning of the 20th century Heraeus became a pioneer in the automatization of combustion analysis for the determination of non-metallic elements like carbon, nitrogen, sulphur, hydrogen and oxygen in chemicals, pharmaceuticals and environmental samples. This development was made possible through the experience gained in the high temperature furnace technology needed for melting of platinum, which has a high melting point of 1770 degrees Celsius. Building on the know-how in handling high temperatures for chemical processes, Richard Küch, a researcher at the Heraeus Platinum Smelting Factory, was able to produce quartz glass of very high purity, which is still the material of choice for combustion tubes used in modern combustion analyzers. Richard Küch's invention together with the experience in high temperature furnace technology resulted in the commercial production of automated and semi-automated elemental analyzers. Due to the too low profitability and different nature compared to the precious metal core business of Heraeus, the Analytical Technology Division was sold in 1995 to form Elementar.

Speciality products

Quartz glass 
Heraeus began to continuously expand its product portfolio starting at the turn of the 20th century, moving into areas such as the production of optical instruments, infrared emitters and laboratory equipment. It produced plates, prisms and corrective lenses for the optical industry (under the names Homosil and Ultrasil) plus opaque quartz glass under the name Rotosil. In the late 1960s, Heraeus also produced ultra-pure isotropic/homogeneous quartz glass for space exploration. This special optical quartz glass was used in retroreflectors set up on the moon during the Apollo landings. These were used to measure the exact distance between the earth and the moon and are still in use today.

Heraeus also developed a new process for making high-quality synthetic quartz glass from silicon tetrachloride. In the late 1960s, this opened up a completely new market for the company: quartz fibre technology for the optical transmission of data in the telecommunications industry, followed by product developments in the field of optical fibres in 1972. In 1986, the first synthetic waveguide tubes were developed, and in 1992, production of synthetic quartz glass began in Bitterfeld. Heraeus has established itself as a supplier of devices and optical components for the semiconductor industry.

Speciality lighting 
In 1904, Richard Küch discovered that evaporated quicksilver (mercury) in a quartz tube acted as an intense light source when stimulated with electricity. In light of this discovery, Heraeus joined forces with AEG and founded a quartz lamp company, culminating in the development of the ‘Original Hanau Synthetic Sunlamp’ which flooded onto the German market as early as the 1930s. By the 1950s, the tanning lamp had become a popular consumer electronics item. After buying out AEG in 1973, a number of newly developed products were added to the range. Heraeus Noblelight now supplies infrared and ultraviolet emitters as well as UV-LEDs to a variety of industries, for use in automotive production, printing, plastics and semiconductors, analytical instruments, laser and environmental technology in solariums, and water and air treatment.

Sensors 
Heraeus first started producing thermocouples and thermometers with platinum and platinum alloy wires under the directorship of Richard Küch. The technology still forms the basis of Heraeus temperature measurement technology today. By the mid-1960s, analysis technology was added to the product portfolio. After the takeover of the Belgian Electro-Nite Group in 1987, immersion thermocouples and gas probes were added to Heraeus's array of measurement technology for use in the steel and aluminium industry. In 1997, the company founded Heraeus Sensor-Nite, specialised in temperature sensors needed in platinum thin-film technology for use in automotive construction, electronics and household appliances.

Customers 
Heraeus supplies products to manufacturing companies in the automotive sector, the aerospace sector, telecommunications, the chemical industry, medical technology and the steel industry.

References

External links
 Official Company Website
 Heraeus Kulzer South America
 Heraeus Kulzer South America

Medical technology companies of Germany
Companies based in Hesse
German companies established in 1851
Bullion dealers
Manufacturing companies of Germany
German brands
Hanau
Corporate groups